Victor Ramon Beasley Jr. (born July 8, 1992) is an American football linebacker for the Vegas Vipers of the XFL. After playing college football for Clemson University, Beasley was drafted by the Atlanta Falcons with the eighth overall pick in the 2015 NFL Draft.

Beasley was a consensus All-American for the Tigers in 2013 and 2014. He is also the schools all-time sack leader (33). Following Beasley's senior season, he was named ACC Defensive Player of the Year. In 2016, Beasley was named to his first Pro Bowl and All-Pro honors, following his league-leading 15.5 sack season.

Early years
Beasley attended Adairsville High School in Adairsville, Georgia, where he was a three-sport standout in football, basketball, and track. He played as running back and linebacker for the Adairsville Tigers high school football team. He was named All-county and All-area in both his junior and senior seasons. As a junior, he totaled 57 tackles, two recovered fumbles and an interception, while also hauling in 15 receptions for over 200 yards. As a senior, he had 120 rushes for 828 yards with seven touchdowns on offense, and had 102 tackles (12 for loss) and an interception on the defensive side of the ball. In addition, he also had seven punt returns for a 17.3-yard average and two touchdowns, and also returned a kickoff return 80 yards for a score. He was named first-team All-state by Associated Press (AP) and Georgia Sportswriters Association. He also played in the Georgia North-South All-Star game, where he had a blocked field goal.

In addition to football, Beasley competed in track & field while at Adairsville, where he competed mainly in sprints and jumps. At the 2010 GHSAA Regional 7-AA Championships, he placed third in the high jump (6-0 or 1.84m) and second in the triple jump (44-0 or 13.44m), while also earning a third-place finish in the 100-meter dash race after running a personal-best time of 11.14 seconds.

Considered a four-star recruit by ESPN.com, Beasley was listed as the No. 19 athlete in the nation in 2010. He was rated as the No. 37 athlete in the nation and No. 37 player in Georgia by Rivals.com. He was considered the No. 34 outside linebacker in the nation and No. 37 player in Georgia by Scout.com. Also an All-Southeast Region pick and the No. 33 player in the state according to SuperPrep. Beasley chose Clemson over Alabama, Auburn, and Stanford.

College career

Freshman season
Upon arriving at Clemson in 2010, Beasley was redshirted. He began working as a tight end. Due to Beasley's size and speed, he was also used as a scout team quarterback in his redshirt year.

Redshirt freshman season
As a redshirt freshman in 2011, Beasley played sparingly. In nine games, he only played 16 snaps and recorded two tackles on the season.

Redshirt sophomore season
As a sophomore in 2012, Beasley recorded 18 tackles and a team-high eight sacks. He was named an Honorable Mention Sophomore All-American by College Football News.

Redshirt junior season
Through the first six games of his junior season in 2013, Beasley led the nation in sacks with 13. Beasley was a first-team All-Atlantic Coast Conference (ACC) selection and was named a consensus All-American. Beasley and the Tigers upset #6 Ohio State Buckeyes in the Orange Bowl.

Redshirt senior season
Beasley opted to stay his senior year to finish his education instead of declaring for the 2014 NFL Draft. He was projected to have been picked up in the second round as predicted by the NFL's draft advisory board. Beasley entered the year with 21 career sacks, which was seven away from setting the all-time school record for career which was set by Michael Dean Perry and Gaines Adams at 28. In October, he broke the record. He was named the ACC Defensive Player of the Year and was again a consensus All-American.

Professional career

Atlanta Falcons

2015 season
Prior to the draft, Beasley was praised for being an explosive athlete who was always first off the snap. Many scouts viewed him as a true edge bender who could torque his hips and shoulders to turn the corner. He was also recognized for his ankle flexion to dip and slalom around the corner at difficult angles to block.  On the other hand, critics said Beasley lacked ideal arm length. They said he was too often content to stay blocked if his pass rush stalled out. Others said he needed to shed blocks more consistently against run.  While many noted his good football character, some scouts were concerned about a lack of alpha-dog tenacity.  Beasley was selected with the eighth overall pick by the Atlanta Falcons in the 2015 NFL Draft. He was Clemson's highest selected defensive player since the late defensive end Gaines Adams went fourth overall to the Tampa Bay Buccaneers in 2007.

On June 12, 2015, Beasley agreed to terms his rookie contract.

In Week 2 of his rookie season, Beasley recorded his first career sack, taking down New York Giants quarterback Eli Manning, before generating his second sack the following week against Brandon Weeden of the Dallas Cowboys. In Week 16 against the undefeated Carolina Panthers, Beasley made a strip-sack of Cam Newton in the final minutes of the game, securing a 20-13 upset of the Panthers and ruining the Panther's undefeated season.

2016 season
In 2016, Beasley moved from defensive end to the strongside linebacker position. He recorded his first sack of the 2016 season in Week 2 against the Oakland Raiders. Beasley had a breakout game in Week 5 of the 2016 season, playing the Denver Broncos, Beasley recorded eight total tackles, 3.5 sacks, and two forced fumbles. Due to his performance during the 2016 season, Beasley was selected to his first Pro Bowl, but did not participate due to the Falcons making Super Bowl LI.  Beasley ended the season with a league-leading 15.5 sacks. He was named First team All-Pro, and was ranked 40th by his peers on the NFL Top 100 Players of 2017.

2017 season
In Week 2, in the 34–23 victory over the Green Bay Packers, Beasley sacked Packers quarterback Aaron Rodgers and forced a fumble, which was recovered by teammate Desmond Trufant for a touchdown. However, in the game, he suffered a hamstring injury, and was ruled out for a month. On the season, Beasley played in 14 games with eight starts, recording 29 tackles and only five sacks after being moved from defensive end to outside linebacker.

2018 season
On April 25, 2018, the Falcons exercised the fifth-year option on Beasley's contract. He played in 16 games with nine starts, recording 20 combined tackles, five sacks, and three passes defensed.

2019 season
In Week 2 against the Philadelphia Eagles, Beasley recorded his first sack of the season in the 24-20 win. In Week 14 against the Carolina Panthers, Beasley recorded two sacks, one of which was a strip sack that was recovered by teammate Tyeler Davison, in the 40–20 win. Beasley played in 16 games with 15 starts, recording 42 combined tackles, eight sacks, and two forced fumbles. After the season, the Falcons announced that they would not re-sign him. He became an unrestricted free agent at the beginning of the new league year on March 18, 2020.

Tennessee Titans
On March 31, 2020, Beasley signed a one-year contract with the Tennessee Titans. He was placed on the reserve/did not report list at the start of training camp on July 28, 2020. He reported to the Titans on August 7 and was moved back to the active roster. He was placed on the active/non-football injury list on August 11. He was activated on September 5, 2020. Beasley was waived by the Titans on November 4 after recording only three tackles through seven games.

Las Vegas Raiders
On November 23, 2020, Beasley was signed to the Las Vegas Raiders practice squad. He was elevated to the active roster on December 5 and December 12 for the team's weeks 13 and 14 games against the New York Jets and Indianapolis Colts, and reverted to the practice squad after each game. On December 15, 2020, Beasley was promoted to the active roster.

Vegas Vipers
Beasley was selected 1st overall in the 2023 XFL Defensive Front Seven Draft, by the Vegas Vipers.

NFL statistics

References

External links

Atlanta Falcons bio
Clemson Tigers bio

1992 births
Living people
People from Adairsville, Georgia
Sportspeople from the Atlanta metropolitan area
Players of American football from Georgia (U.S. state)
American football defensive ends
American football linebackers
Clemson Tigers football players
All-American college football players
Atlanta Falcons players
Tennessee Titans players
Las Vegas Raiders players
Vegas Vipers players
National Conference Pro Bowl players